Jayhawk may refer to:

Jayhawker, originally a term for United States Civil War guerrilla fighters, later applied generally to residents of Kansas
Jayhawk (mascot), the mascot of many schools and their sports teams, derived from the term Jayhawker

Kansas Jayhawks, teams of the University of Kansas
Head-Royce School, Oakland, California
Urbandale High School, Urbandale, Iowa
Jayhawk-Linn Junior-Senior High School near Mound City, Kansas
Vandercook Lake High School, Jackson, Michigan
Muskegon Community College, Muskegon, Michigan
Jamestown Community College, Jamestown, New York
Jefferson Central School, Jefferson, New York
Jericho High School in Jericho, New York
Jeannette City School District in Jeannette, Pennsylvania
St. Joseph Catholic High School (Ogden, Utah)

Vehicles
Beechcraft AQM-37 Jayhawk, supersonic target drone produced by Raytheon for the US Navy
Raytheon T-1 Jayhawk, twin-engine jet trainer used by the US Air Force
Sikorsky MH-60 Jayhawk, US Coast Guard medium range recovery helicopter

Other uses
Jayhawk, California, in El Dorado County
Jayhawk Owens (born 1969), American baseball player
The Jayhawks, a band from Minnesota
The Jayhawks (album), 1986
Jayhawk Area Council, an eastern Kansas council of the Boy Scouts of America
Tejas and Jayhawk, code names for canceled Intel microprocessors
Jayhawkers (film), a 2014 American sports drama/biographical film

See also

Kansas
University of Kansas